Rosena Chantelle Allin-Khan (born 10 May 1978) is a British politician and medical doctor serving as Shadow Cabinet Minister for Mental Health since 2020. A member of the Labour Party, she has been Member of Parliament (MP) for Tooting since the 2016 Tooting by-election.

She stood as a candidate at the 2020 Labour Party deputy leadership election, finishing in second-place after three rounds of voting. She was previously Shadow Minister for Sport between October 2016 and January 2020.

Early life and education 
Rosena Chantelle Allin-Khan was born in Tooting. Her parents were both musicians: her Polish mother had been a singer in the Polish girl group Filipinki, and met her father, originally from Pakistan, while the band was on tour in London. After having two children together, the couple separated. Rosena's mother worked at three jobs to support Rosena and her brother.

Allin-Khan was educated at Trinity St Mary's Primary School, Balham, followed by The Grey Coat Hospital. But her disappointing A-level grades, two Es and a U, dashed her hopes of being accepted to study medicine. Instead, she studied medical biochemistry at Brunel University, funding her education through a series of part-time jobs and establishing a strong record. She was accepted to study medicine at Lucy Cavendish College, Cambridge, where she was assisted by scholarships.

Medical career
After qualifying as a doctor, Allin-Khan worked at the Royal London and Homerton Hospitals. She also completed a Master's degree in public health. Following this, she worked as a humanitarian aid doctor in Gaza and Israel, Africa, and Asia.

Prior to her election to the House of Commons, she worked as a junior doctor in the accident and emergency department at St George's Hospital in Tooting. In addition to her parliamentary and ministerial work, Allin-Khan continues to work occasional shifts at St George's Hospital during parliamentary recesses.

Political career

Allin-Khan's work in public health also led her to become active in local politics. She was elected as a councillor on Wandsworth Council for Bedford Ward in Balham, serving from 2014 to 2018. She served as deputy leader of the council's Labour group.

Allin-Khan was selected as the Labour Party candidate for the Tooting constituency, after the seat became vacant in May 2016; the sitting MP, Sadiq Khan, had resigned after he had won that year's London mayoral election.

Allin-Khan's by-election campaign emphasised her local, working-class roots and Polish-Pakistani ancestry. When the election results were announced, Allin-Khan read a tribute to Jo Cox, the Labour MP for Batley and Spen who was murdered on the day of the by-election.

She campaigned to remain in the EU during the 2016 Brexit referendum, and later campaigned with the same position for a second referendum on the issue.

In October 2016, Allin-Khan was appointed Shadow Minister for Sport. While in this position, she pledged to introduce safe standing at football matches in the UK from the 2020/21 season, if Labour won the next election. She further campaigned to have England's semi-final match against Croatia during the 2018 World Cup to be shown on big screens in public. She said that the St George's Flag had become associated with the far-right, and was pleased that the success of England in the World Cup had helped reclaim the flag for the wider population.

Allin-Khan retained her seat in the 2017 general election and the 2019 general elections. She received a higher number of votes in the first of these elections, strengthening her position, but falling back slightly in the 2019 election.

Allin-Khan stood as a candidate in the 2020 Labour Party deputy leadership election. During the campaign, she said that she would be a unifying candidate, and highlighted her working-class background, and experience as a doctor. She ultimately received 77,351 (16.8%) of first preference votes, and 113,858 (26.1%) in the final round, coming second to Angela Rayner.

She was appointed as Shadow Minister for Mental Health in Keir Starmer's first shadow cabinet, shadowing Nadine Dorries. Since the start of the coronavirus pandemic in the UK, Allin-Khan has been working 12-hour shifts at St George's Hospital in Tooting, in addition to her job as an MP and a shadow minister.

She called for more mental health support to NHS staff during the pandemic, noting that there was a "rise in suicides, self-harm and suicidal ideation among frontline NHS and care staff" due to "a lack of PPE, an increased workload ... and witnessing more patients die". She also criticised the UK Government for being too slow in acting, saying that it should have sooner introduced measures such as the lockdown and widespread testing.

In October 2020, the Parliamentary Commissioner for Standards rebuked Allin-Khan for breaching the Code of Conduct for Members of Parliament.  As this was Allin-Khan's third breach of the rules, the matter was referred to the Parliamentary Committee on Standards.

In the May 2021 British shadow cabinet reshuffle, she was made a Shadow Secretary of State, which was changed to Shadow Cabinet Minister in November 2021.

Personal life 
Allin-Khan is married and lives in Tooting with her husband, who is Welsh. She is a Muslim. The couple have two daughters.

She is an amateur boxer, training at Balham Boxing Club. Allin-Khan also serves as  the team doctor.

Notes

References

External links

Living people
21st-century British medical doctors
Alumni of Brunel University London
Alumni of Lucy Cavendish College, Cambridge
British politicians of Pakistani descent
Councillors in the London Borough of Wandsworth
British emergency physicians
English Muslims
English people of Pakistani descent
English people of Polish descent
Female members of the Parliament of the United Kingdom for English constituencies
Labour Party (UK) councillors
Labour Party (UK) MPs for English constituencies
People from Tooting
UK MPs 2015–2017
UK MPs 2017–2019
UK MPs 2019–present
21st-century British women politicians
Politicians from London
1978 births
National Health Service people
21st-century English women
21st-century English people
Women councillors in England